Salt River Canyon Wilderness is a   wilderness area located within the Tonto National Forest in the U.S. state of Arizona.

Background
The Salt River and its deep canyon bisect the entire length of the wilderness.  Elevations range from 2,200 feet (671 m) at the lower end of the canyon to 4,200 feet (1,280 m) on White Ledge Mountain.

The area can be visited practically any time, though there are no maintained trails within the entire wilderness.  Travel here is typically done by raft or kayak during the short river-running season between March 1 and May 15.  A visitor permit is required between these dates and group size is limited to 15 people.  White-water rafting the Salt River Canyon is fairly popular, with 27 sets of rapids and numerous side creeks to explore.

U.S. Route 60 and Arizona State Route 77 traverse a winding route through the canyon, descending close to the river at the bottom before crossing the river and then ascending back up the opposite side.

See also
 List of Arizona Wilderness Areas
 List of U.S. Wilderness Areas
 Wilderness Act

References

External links
 

Protected areas of Gila County, Arizona
Wilderness areas of Arizona
Canyons and gorges of Arizona
Landforms of Gila County, Arizona
Tonto National Forest
Protected areas established in 1984
1984 establishments in Arizona